Leon Francis Phillips (born 14 July 1935) is a New Zealand physical chemist specialising in the gas-liquid interface and atmospheric chemistry.

Biography
Born in Thames on 14 July 1935, Phillips was educated at Westport Technical College and Christchurch Boys' High School. He studied at Canterbury University College, from where he graduated with an MSc with first-class honours in 1958. After a PhD at the University of Cambridge and post-doctoral research at McGill University, he returned to lecture at Canterbury, rising to the rank of professor in 1966.

In 1968 he was elected a Fellow of the Royal Society of New Zealand, and in 1979 he won the society's Hector Medal.

In 1959, Phillips married Pamela Anne Johnstone, and the couple went on to have two children.

Selected works

References

1935 births
Living people
People from Thames, New Zealand
People educated at Buller High School
People educated at Christchurch Boys' High School
University of Canterbury alumni
Alumni of Christ's College, Cambridge
Academic staff of the University of Canterbury
New Zealand chemists
Physical chemists
Fellows of the Royal Society of New Zealand
20th-century New Zealand scientists